Stephen John Valentine (born 26 October 1966) is a Scottish actor and magician. He is known for his roles as Nigel Townsend on NBC's crime drama series Crossing Jordan, the voice of Harry Flynn in the video game Uncharted 2: Among Thieves, and the voice of Alistair in the Dragon Age video game franchise.

Career
Valentine started his career as a magician; on the audio commentary for Spider-Man 3, actress Bryce Dallas Howard revealed that he performed magic at her seventh birthday party. He has been seen in films such as Mars Attacks!, Teen Beach Movie, and Avalon High. He was a main cast member on Crossing Jordan and has guest starred on such shows as House, Monk, Just Shoot Me, Will & Grace, Dharma & Greg, Psych, and Charmed. Valentine hosted Syfy's reality show Estate of Panic. He voiced Alistair in the Dragon Age: Origins video game franchise and Harry Flynn in the video game Uncharted 2: Among Thieves. He is also an accomplished magician, using this skill to portray magicians occasionally. He starred as Derek Jupiter in the Disney XD sitcom I'm in the Band.

Filmography

Television
Actor

Writer

Director

Miscellaneous

Films

Video games

References

External links 
 Interview with Daily Record Showbiz
 
 

1966 births
20th-century Scottish male actors
21st-century Scottish male actors
Living people
Male actors from London
People from Bishopbriggs
People with acquired American citizenship
Scottish emigrants to the United States
Scottish magicians
Scottish male film actors
Scottish male television actors
Scottish male video game actors
Scottish male voice actors
Scottish television directors
Scottish television writers
Academy of Magical Arts Close-Up Magician of the Year winners
Academy of Magical Arts Lecturer of the Year winners
Academy of Magical Arts Stage Magician of the Year winners